Günter Bergau (born 11 April 1939) is a retired German rower. He competed for the United Team of Germany at the 1964 Summer Olympics in the coxed pairs and for East Germany at the 1968 Summer Olympics in eights and finished in seventh place in both events. Bergau won a gold and a silver medal at the European championships in 1964 and 1967. In the doubles his rowing partner was Peter Gorny, whereas his coxswain in all events was Karl-Heinz Danielowski.

References

1939 births
Living people
People from Pillau
East German male rowers
Olympic rowers of the United Team of Germany
Olympic rowers of East Germany
Rowers at the 1964 Summer Olympics
Rowers at the 1968 Summer Olympics
European Rowing Championships medalists